Jouveau is a French surname. Notable people with the surname include:

Gabriel Jouveau-Dubreuil (1851–1945), French archaeologist
Marius Jouveau (1878–1949), French poet
René Jouveau (1906–1997), French poet and non-fiction writer

French-language surnames